The Frontier Radio is a family of software-defined radios developed by the Johns Hopkins University Applied Physics Laboratory (or APL). Three variants have been developed: the Frontier Radio (FR), the Frontier Radio Lite (FR Lite), and the Frontier Radio Virtual Radio (FR VR). In addition, the Frontier-S is a licensed derivative manufactured by commercial aerospace company Rocket Lab.

History

Parents and predecessors 
The creation of the FR family was predated by the transceivers built for the New Horizons, TIMED, and CONTOUR spacecraft, all of which required lightweight transceivers with low power consumption. These transceivers were incredibly successful; for example, the transceiver for New Horizons managed to save 12 W from total mission power and ended up being a mission-enabler. Based on what they learned from these missions, APL saw the opportunity to build a general-purpose radio with even lower SWaP (Size, Weight, and Power) as a software-defined radio platform usable by any aerospace organization. Using an SDR platform would also allow them to build transceivers with higher data-rate return link capabilities and better radiation tolerance than previous radios. APL brought the idea before NASA, who approved further research.

Frontier Radio history 
The first iteration of the FR to fly on a mission was the near space version on the Van Allen Probes (VAP) mission, used because of its high radiation tolerance and low SWaP. The transceiver wa still operating five years later as VAP wrapped up the last few years of its mission. A deep space version of the FR flew on the Parker Solar Probe (PSP) mission in 2018. This version was modified for the much longer PSP mission with updates such as software enhancements to improve downlink frame rates, a transceiver fit to operate at higher frequency bands like X and Ka band, and hardware enhancements to increase processing capacity.

Missions continued to need radios with even lower SWaP capabilities, and as needs further diversified, smaller missions were developed that did not need all the stringent protections the FR promised. This encouraged the development of the Frontier Radio Lite, a much smaller radio for resource-constrained small satellite missions. The biggest change was a reduction in the maximum data rates and the signal sensitivity, achieving  a lower power consumption, while some radiation tolerance was sacrificed to achieve a better SWaP . Next came the Frontier Radio Virtual Radio, intermediate between the FR and the FR Lite. It combines the robust nature and processing power of the original radio with a reprogrammable design and more modern architecture used by the FR Lite.

Versions

Heritage Frontier Radio 
Following the launch of the New Horizons mission and its incredibly low SWaP radio, NASA funded more research into low SWaP, highly reliable radio products for future missions by APL, this time utilizing software-defined platforms. The grant led to the creation of the heritage Frontier Radio (FR), built for near and deep space applications and so far unmatched in capability, SWaP, and radiation tolerance.

Types 
The heritage FR has two main versions: a near space radio that operates at S-band, like the one that flew on the VAP mission, and a deep space application that operates at X/Ka-band. (The X-band digital receiver on the deep space radio is actually a modified version of the receiver on the New Horizons spacecraft.) The deep space FR uses the same core infrastructure as the near Earth FR, with some improvements made since the iteration that flew with the VAP, including reduction of SWaP, improved robustness, reduction of noise effects, higher speed signal conversion and processing, and better signal acquisition and tracking.

Key features 
The FR has a separate interface board so that the hardware can be customized to each mission without having to build a brand new radio. Certain features can also be reconfigured in flight, like in-band channel assignment, bit rate, loop bandwidths, and coding formats. Its components are highly reliable, designed for tough environments without using too much battery power. It can withstand total ionizing doses (TID) of up to 100 krad (1 kGy) and has single event latch-up (SEL, or a latch-up caused by a single event upset) immunity of 85 MeV-cm2/mg of linear energy transfer (LET); this means it can withstand a large amount of radiation and energy from energetic electron/protons.

Limitations 
The FR is not reprogrammable. It is also the largest radio in the family, making it the least efficient in volume.

Frontier Radio Lite 
The Frontier Radio Lite is the smaller version of its sibling, the Frontier Radio, fitting all of its systems onto a single card. The original S-band operator was the first in the family to be repgrogrammable. Designed for missions with high risk tolerance and quick schedules, it may not be as robust as the other members of the FR family, but the savings on SWaP make it ideal for missions that don’t want to design an entire radio for smaller satellites.

Types 
Two versions of the FR Lite that have been designed and built. The first is a two-way radio operating at S-band, and the second is a L-band receiver for GPS L1 & L2, renamed the Extensible Global Navigation System (EGNS) n. There are also, as of August 2018, two other board types are in development. A version of the FR Lite that could support up to X-band and Ka-band is planned. Another idea that in development as of August 2018 is a version that includes a printed circuit board (PCB) to allow for the drop-in of pretested voltage controlled oscillators (VCOs) instead of using built-in,oscillators. which would allow the board to be further customizable

Key features 
The FR Lite is built with a reprogrammable field-programmable gate array (FPGA) instead of a single-use array,   greatly decreasing development  total cost to sponsors by allowing further flexibility. It also has an enormous SWaP reduction compared to the FR;  is its mass and volume are less than 25% of the FR’s,  and its receive and transmit modes  use less than 30% of the total FR power. This was accomplished through transitioning a number of analog hardware sections into firmware, sharing components of the circuit for the up and down conversions of frequencies, and a number of smaller changes.

Limitations 
The FR Lite sacrifices some of its radiation tolerance and SEL immunity in order to achieve its low SWaP demands; it can only withstand TID of about 20-40 krads and has a 20% reduction in SEL immunity compared to the FR.

Frontier Radio Virtual Radio 
The Frontier Radio Virtual Radio (FR VR) is the newest addition to the FR family. With the capabilities of the FR and the programmability of the FR Lite, the FR VR meets the needs of missions that require a radio with greater capabilities than its siblings. It has the most processing power in the  family, but still manages to be smaller than the FR and have similar power consumption to its parent  when operated as   a radio . The FR VR has enough processing power to additionally support the transceiver functions of a satellite and its entire avionics system. It does this with two cards: a single-board computer card (SBC) to handle digital content and an RF card (RFC) comprising all analog hardware.

Types 
The FR VR currently has two versions. The original has the capability to operate up through X-band for the receiver and transmitter; the second version  has capability for up and downlink at X/Ka-band with a L-band receiver.

Key features 
The SBC only uses about 20% of the reprogrammable FPGA firmware to operate all digital processes of the FR VR. The rest can be used for other processes onboard the satellite. It is this digital power that allows for all analog content to be housed on the RFC.

 The RFC acts as four cards wrapped up in a single board, equipped to handle all the analog components of the radio. It saves on analog space by digitizing one of the IF stages in the receiver/transmitter, like the FR Lite. It uses many of the advances that allowed the FR Lite to minimize SWaP, including sharing local oscillator circuitry. Besides the SWaP saving updates and the reprogrammable FPGA, the VR retains a lot of similarity to the FR; it even has the same radiation tolerance and high reliability of its parent. Concerning available frequency bands, the FR VR has four available RF chains, allowing the current version to operate up through X-band. The goal is that the FR VR will eventually match all the capabilities of the FR and be able to fully replace the heritage radio.

Limitations 
The downlink data rates of the FR VR are limited to 10 Msps (in comparison to the FR, which has downlink symbol rates at X-band up to 100 Msps). Also, the FR VR does not yet have the capability for Ka-band operation, but there are plans to incorporate a multi-chip module (MCM) to accomplish this.

Frontier-S 
The Frontier-S is a variant of the Frontier radio manufactured by United States-based aerospace company Rocket Lab, who licensed the design in 2021 for commercial use. Currently, the Frontier-S has flown on Rocket Lab's Photon Pathstone spacecraft, launched in March 2021, and is planned to fly on the Photon spacecraft used for the CAPSTONE mission in March 2022 as well as a private mission to Venus. Rocket Lab also produces a "deep-space" variant with additional features.

Comparison  

*Bare slices only; total volume/mass depends on packaging.

†Frontier Radio & FR VR numbers include an ovenized oscillator and +28V bus power converter unit with ~1.4-W quiescent draw and ~80% efficiency vs. a lower-power TCXO and lower-voltage 6-12V bus power on FR Lite.

‡Two transmit channels switchable but not simultaneous.

Future missions 
Another future mission that is set to fly a member of the FR family is the Europa Lander mission in 2025. In order to determine if Europa, one of Jupiter’s smaller moons holding a liquid ocean beneath a layer of ice, could support life, NASA is sending the lander to investigate the surface of the moon. The current plan concerning the radio, is, for the Europa Lander and its Carrier and Relay Stage (CRS) is to use a version of the heritage FR with added X-band functionality for cross-banded uplink and downlink. 

FR radios have flown on various Cubesat missions. An L-band version of FR Lite (EGNS) flew on a Cubesat mission in 2019. Also, a version of the FR VR with S-band receive and transmit (with L-band receive as well) will fly on a JHU/APL Cubesat mission in 2022.

References 

Software-defined radio